Watter Khani is a village  in Kupwara district of the Indian union territory of Jammu and Kashmir.

Demographics 

According to the 2011 census of India, Watter Khani has 152 households. The literacy rate of Watter Khani was 64.49% compared to 67.16% of Jammu and Kashmir. In Watter Khani, Male literacy stands at 35.29% while the female literacy rate was 29.20%.

Transport

Road 
Watter Khani is connected by road with other places in Jammu and Kashmir and India through NH 701.

Rail 
The nearest railway stations to Watter Khani are Sopore railway station and Baramulla railway station both located at a distance of 40.5 kilometres from Watter Khani.

Air 
The nearest airport is Srinagar International Airport located at a distance of 90 kilometres.

See also 
 Trehgam
Kigam
 Wavoora
 Lolab Valley
 Gurez
 Tulail Valley

References 

Villages in Kupwara district